Alfred Godfrey Calverley (24 November 1917 − October 1991) was an English footballer who played as an outside left for several League clubs.

Playing career
He joined his hometown team, Huddersfield Town from school, then moved to Mossley where he played a couple of games before returning to Huddersfield. He guested for several clubs during the Second World War, rejoining Huddersfield when it ended, though never made a League appearance for them and moved to Mansfield Town in June 1946.

Calverley was signed by Arsenal for £2,500 in March 1947. Preston North End, the opposition team in his debut game, had been so impressed by him that they persuaded Arsenal to sell him for £1,500 four months later.

Joining Second Division Doncaster Rovers for a then club record fee of £4,000 in November 1947, he was an influential figure in their 1949−50 Third Division (North) title triumph but injury problems curtailed his playing career in December 1952. He scored 13 times in his 153 League and cup appearances for Rovers.

Death
He died in Sheffield towards the end of 1991.

References

1917 births
1991 deaths
Footballers from Huddersfield
English footballers
Association football forwards
Huddersfield Town A.F.C. players
Mossley A.F.C. players
Mansfield Town F.C. players
Arsenal F.C. players
Preston North End F.C. players
Doncaster Rovers F.C. players
English Football League players
Sheffield United F.C. wartime guest players